Rolph is a surname and a masculine given name, and may refer to:

Surname
 C. H. Rolph, pen-name of C. R. Hewitt (1901–1994), English police officer, journalist, editor, and author
 Ebony Rolph (born 1994), Australian basketball player
 Gary Rolph (born 1960), English football player
 George Rolph (1794–1875), Canadian lawyer and politician
 James Rolph (1869–1934), American politician
 Jessica Rolph (born 1974), American businesswoman
 John Rolph, multiple people
 Sue Rolph (born 1978), British swimmer
 Thomas Rolph (disambiguation), multiple people

Given name
 Rolph Barnes (1904–1982), Canadian athlete
 Rolph Gobits (born 1947), Dutch photographer 
 Rolph Grant (1909–1977), West Indian cricketer
 Rolph van der Hoeven (born 1948), Dutch academic and economist
 Justin Rolph Loomis (1810–1898), American academic
 Rolph Payet (born 1968), Seychelles academic and diplomat
 Rolph Ludwig Edward Schwarzenberger (1936–1992), British mathematician
 Michel-Rolph Trouillot (1949–2012), Haitian American academic and anthropologist

See also
 Rolf
 Rolfe (surname)
Surnames from given names
Masculine given names